The following highways are numbered 56A:

United States
 Nebraska Spur 56A
 New York State Route 56A (former)

See also
List of highways numbered 56